Joseph T. Bendik (born April 25, 1989) is an American professional soccer player who plays as a goalkeeper for Major League Soccer club Philadelphia Union.

Club career

Clemson 
Bendik grew up in Marietta, Georgia and attended Clemson University for four years after graduating from Harrison High School in Kennesaw, Georgia.

Sogndal 
After university, Bendik signed with Norwegian club Sogndal. He began the 2010 season as a backup, and made his professional debut in the first round of the Norwegian Cup against Årdal FK. Bendik ended the season starting in four league matches helping his club gain promotion to the Norwegian top flight.

Bendik began the 2011 season as the starter, and made his Tippeligaen debut on March 20, 2011, against Strømsgodset IF.
 He ended the year starting the final two matches of the season, including a 2–1 victory over eventual league champions Molde FK.

Portland Timbers 
On February 24, 2012, Bendik signed with the Portland Timbers of MLS. He made his Timbers debut as a second-half sub for an injured Troy Perkins in a 2–0 loss to the Montreal Impact.

Toronto FC 
On December 12, 2012, Bendik was acquired by Toronto FC along with Portland's third overall pick in the 2013 MLS SuperDraft in exchange for Ryan Johnson and Miloš Kocić.

While originally considered a back-up, Bendik went on to make 33 appearances for Toronto during the 2013 season after starting goalkeeper Stefan Frei was injured during a pre-season friendly.

On December 1, 2015, it was announced that Toronto FC had declined their options on Bendik, and that he would not return to the team. Along with Bendik, fellow goalkeeper Chris Konopka's options were also declined, leaving the team with only one goalkeeper Quillain Roberts.

Orlando City SC 
On December 21, 2015, it was announced that Bendik had been traded to Orlando City in exchange for a conditional fourth-round pick in the 2017 MLS SuperDraft. Despite conceding a league high 60 goals for that season in his first league campaign with Orlando, Bendik became a fan favorite as he played every minute of the club's 34 league games, making 114 saves and posting 5 shutouts. He won 11 "MLS Save of the Week" awards in the process and his stop against Sporting Kansas City's Dom Dwyer in the Lions' 2–1 road loss on May 15 was voted "MLS Save of the Year".

After a difficult 2018 season in which the team conceded an all-time MLS record 74 goals and Bendik himself had lost the starting job to both Earl Edwards, Jr. and then again to Adam Grinwis, his contract option was declined at the end of the year. At the time of his departure he had the second most appearances in the team's post-expansion history behind only Cristian Higuita.

Columbus Crew SC 
On December 27, 2018, Bendik's rights were acquired by Columbus Crew SC in exchange for $50,000 in targeted allocation money.

Philadelphia Union
On July 19, 2019, Bendik was traded to the Philadelphia Union for a second-round pick in the 2020 MLS SuperDraft. Bendik's contract expired with Philadelphia following their 2020 season. He re-signed with the club on March 5, 2021. Bendik again re-signed with the Union following their MLS Eastern Conference Championship season in 2022 on a one-year deal for the 2023 season.  Bendik was elevated to the Union's No. 2 goalkeeper following the trade of Matt Freese to the New York City Football Club.

International career 
Bendik has represented the United States at the under-17, under-18 and under-20 levels. On June 3, Bendik was named as one of six goalkeepers in Bruce Arena's preliminary 40-man roster for the 2017 Gold Cup, although he was left off the final 23-man squad.

Career statistics

Club

Honors

Club
Sogndal
 Norwegian First Division Championship: 2010

Philadelphia Union
 Supporters' Shield: 2020

References

External links

altomfotball.no player profile

1989 births
Living people
Soccer players from Georgia (U.S. state)
American soccer players
American expatriate soccer players
Clemson Tigers men's soccer players
Atlanta Silverbacks U23's players
Sogndal Fotball players
Portland Timbers players
Toronto FC players
Orlando City SC players
Columbus Crew players
Philadelphia Union players
Sportspeople from Marietta, Georgia
Expatriate footballers in Norway
Expatriate soccer players in Canada
USL League Two players
Norwegian First Division players
Eliteserien players
American people of Norwegian descent
Major League Soccer players
United States men's youth international soccer players
United States men's under-20 international soccer players
Association football goalkeepers